Fuentes de Rubielos is a municipality located in the province of Teruel, Aragon, Spain. According to the 2004 census (INE), the municipality had a population of 119 inhabitants.

References

External links 
Fuentes de Rubielos Town Hall Official site
 El Fotolog - Fuentes de Rubielos
 Towns in Aragon
 www.fuentesderubielos.com Non-official site

Municipalities in the Province of Teruel